Alpine is an unincorporated community and a census-designated place (CDP) located in and governed by Rio Grande County, Colorado, United States. The population of the Alpine CDP was 169 at the United States Census 2020. The South Fork post office  serves the area.

Geography

Demographics

See also

Outline of Colorado
Index of Colorado-related articles
State of Colorado
Colorado cities and towns
Colorado census designated places
Colorado counties
Rio Grande County, Colorado

References

External links

Rio Grande County website

Census-designated places in Rio Grande County, Colorado
Census-designated places in Colorado